Higher sulfur oxides are a group of chemical compounds with the formula SO3+x where x lies between 0 and 1. They contain peroxo (O−O) groups, and the oxidation state of sulfur is +6 as in SO3.

Monomeric SO4 can be isolated at low temperatures (below 78 K) following the reaction of SO3 and atomic oxygen or photolysis of SO3–ozone mixtures. The favoured structure is:

Colourless polymeric condensates are formed in the reaction of gaseous SO3 or SO2 with O2 in a silent electric discharge. The structure of the polymers is based on β-SO3 (one of the three forms of solid SO3) with oxide bridges (−O−) replaced randomly by peroxide bridges(−O−O−). As such these compounds are non-stoichiometric.

References

Sulfur oxides
Sulfur(VI) compounds
Non-stoichiometric compounds
Interchalcogens